Corridors of Power is the second solo studio album by Northern Irish guitarist Gary Moore, released in October 1982.

Background
The album contains a cover of the Free song "Wishing Well". The track "End of the World" features Jack Bruce of Cream sharing lead vocals with Moore. Moore would later join with Bruce again on the Bruce-Baker-Moore project in 1993. The album also features then former Deep Purple drummer Ian Paice on most tracks and former Uriah Heep singer John Sloman on backing vocals.

The first 25,000 vinyl copies of Corridors of Power came with a bonus EP featuring three live tracks recorded at the Marquee, London on 25 August 1982.

Japanese rock singer Mari Hamada covered "Love Can Make a Fool of You" (Retitled as "Love, Love, Love") on her 1985 album Rainbow Dream. A far bluesier version of the song also showed up on the posthumous Gary Moore album How Blue Can You Get. As a nod to Corridors of Power, American guitarist Jeff Kollman named his 2012 solo album Silence in the Corridor, the title track of which is a tribute to Moore.

Track listing

Personnel
Gary Moore – lead and rhythm guitars, lead and backing vocals, cover concept
Neil Murray – bass (all except track 5)
Tommy Eyre – keyboards (all except track 5)
Ian Paice – drums, percussion (all except track 6)

Additional personnel
John Sloman – backing vocals
Mo Foster – bass on track 5
Don Airey – keyboards on track 5
Jack Bruce – co-lead vocals on track 6
Bobby Chouinard – drums on track 6

Technical personnel
Jeff Glixman – production
Steve Prestage – engineering, mixing
Nigel Walker – engineering
Ian Cooper – mastering
Steve Barnett, Part Rock – management
Graphyk – artwork

Charts

Album

Singles

References

1982 albums
Albums produced by Jeff Glixman
Gary Moore albums
Virgin Records albums